

Events 
 January–June 
 January 8 – The Jesuit educational plan, known as the Ratio Studiorum, is issued.
 March 12 – Robert Devereux, 2nd Earl of Essex, is appointed Lord Lieutenant of Ireland, by Queen Elizabeth I of England.
 April 23 – The Earl of Essex arrives in Dublin at the head of 16,000 troops, the largest army ever seen in Ireland.
 May 16 – The Kalmar Bloodbath takes place in Kalmar, Sweden.
 May 29 – Essex takes Cahir Castle, supposedly the strongest in Ireland, after a short siege.
 June 20 – The Synod of Diamper is convened.

 July–December 
 July – Second Dutch Expedition to Indonesia: A Dutch fleet returns to Amsterdam, carrying 600,000 pounds of pepper and 250,000 pounds of cloves and nutmeg.
 July 24 – Swedish King Sigismund III Vasa is dethroned by his uncle Duke Charles, who takes over as regent of the realm until 1604, when he becomes King Charles IX.
 August 15 – First Battle of Curlew Pass: Irish forces defeat the English.
 September 21 – The first reported performance at the Globe Theatre in London (erected over Spring/Summer), a presentation of Shakespeare's Julius Caesar (probably new to that year), is recorded by Swiss traveller Thomas Platter the Younger.
 September 28 – The Earl of Essex arrives back in England, disobeying the Queen's strict orders.
 October 18 – Battle of Sellenberk: Michael the Brave, Prince of Wallachia, defeats the army of Andrew Báthory near Șelimbăr, leading to the first recorded unification of the Romanians.
 November 10 – The Åbo Bloodbath takes place in Åbo, Swedish Finland.  
 November – Persian embassy to Europe (1599–1602): A Persian embassy arrives in Moscow.
 December 19 – The forces of Minye Thihathu II of Toungoo and his ally Min Razagyi of the Kingdom of Mrauk U end the First Toungoo Empire by capturing Pegu (modern-day Bago, Myanmar).

 Date unknown 
 The first Capuchin friar is entombed in the Catacombe dei Cappuccini in Palermo (Sicily).

Births

January–March

 January 22 – Robert Petre, 3rd Baron Petre, English baron (d. 1638)
 January 31 – Juraj V Zrinski, Ban of Croatia (d. 1626)
 February 12
 Duke Friedrich of Saxe-Altenburg, third son of Duke Friedrich Wilhelm I of Saxe-Weimar (d. 1625)
 Thomas Whitmore, English lawyer and politician who sat in the House of Commons (d. 1677)
 February 13 – Pope Alexander VII (d. 1667)
 March 1 – John Mennes, English Royal Navy admiral (d. 1671)
 March 3 – Juan Alfonso Enríquez de Cabrera, Viceroy of Sicily and Viceroy of Naples (d. 1647)
 March 13 – John Berchmans, Belgian Jesuit scholastic and saint (d. 1621)
 March 22 – Anthony van Dyck, Flemish painter (d. 1641)
 March 23 – Thomas Selle, German baroque composer (d. 1663)
 March 28 – Witte de With, famous Dutch naval officer of the 17th century (d. 1658)

April–June

 April 9 – Sir Thomas Mauleverer, 1st Baronet (d. 1655)
 April 17 – Patrick Fleming, Irish Franciscan friar and scholar (murdered) (d. 1631)
 April 25 – Oliver Cromwell, Lord Protector of England, Scotland, and Ireland (d. 1658)
 May 16 – Nicolaes Olycan, Dutch businessman (d. 1639)
 May 30 – Samuel Bochart, French Protestant biblical scholar (d. 1667)
 June 1 – Elizabeth Lucretia, Duchess of Cieszyn, Duchess suo jure of Cieszyn (d. 1653)
 June 6 – Diego Velázquez, Spanish painter (d. 1660)

July–September
 July 23 – Stephanius, Danish historian (d. 1650)
 July 27 – Albert IV, Duke of Saxe-Eisenach (1640–1644) (d. 1644)
 August 11 – Christian II, Prince of Anhalt-Bernburg (1630–1656) (d. 1656)
 August 13 – Johannes Buxtorf II, Swiss theologian (d. 1664)
 August 14 – Méric Casaubon, English classicist (d. 1671)
 August 16 – Diego López Pacheco, 7th Duke of Escalona, Spanish noble (d. 1653)
 August 22 – Agatha Marie of Hanau, German noblewoman (d. 1636)
 September 7 – Jacob Westerbaen, Dutch poet (d. 1670)
 September 20 – Christian, Duke of Brunswick-Lüneburg-Wolfenbüttel, German Protestant military leader (d. 1626)
 September 24 – Adam Olearius, German scholar (d. 1671)
 September 25 – Francesco Borromini, Swiss sculptor and architect (d. 1667)
 September 30 – Frances Seymour, Duchess of Somerset (d. 1674)

October–December
 October 10
 Samuel Clarke, English writer and priest (d. 1683)
 Étienne Moulinié, French Baroque composer (d. 1676)
 October 11 – Abraham de Fabert, Marshal of France (d. 1662)
 October 15 – Cornelis de Graeff, Dutch mayor (d. 1664)
 October 28 – Marie of the Incarnation, French foundress of the Ursuline Monastery in Quebec (d. 1672)
 October 31 – Denzil Holles, 1st Baron Holles, English statesman and writer (d. 1680)
 November 5 – Carlo Emanuele Madruzzo, Italian prince-bishop (d. 1658)
 November 11
 Maria Eleonora of Brandenburg, German princess and queen consort of Sweden (d. 1655)
 Ottavio Piccolomini, Austrian-Italian field marshal (d. 1656)
 November 13 – Otto Christoph von Sparr, German general (d. 1668)
 November 15 – Werner Rolfinck, German physician, chemist, botanist and philosopher (d. 1673)
 November 29 – Peter Heylin, English ecclesiastic and author of many polemical works (d. 1662)
 November 30 – Andrea Sacchi, Italian painter of High Baroque Classicism (d. 1661)
 December 2
 Thomas Bruce, 1st Earl of Elgin, Scottish nobleman (d. 1663)
 Alexander Daniell, sole proprietor of the Manor of Alverton, Cornwall (d. 1668)
 December 11 – Pieter Codde, Dutch painter (d. 1678)
 December 14 – Charles Berkeley, 2nd Viscount Fitzhardinge, English politician (d. 1668)
 December 16 – Jacques Vallée, Sieur Des Barreaux, French poet (d. 1673)
 December 20 – Niels Trolle, Governor General of Norway (d. 1667)
 December 29 – Gabriel Bucelin, German historian (d. 1681)

Date unknown
 John Alden, English settler of Plymouth Colony (d. 1687)
 Stefan Czarniecki, Polish military commander (d. 1665)
 Lucy Hay, Countess of Carlisle, English courtier (d. 1660)
 Charlotte Stanley, Countess of Derby defender of Latham House (d. 1664)
 Jirgalang, Qing Dynasty prince (d. 1655)

Deaths 

 January 13 – Edmund Spenser, English poet (b. 1552)
 January 22 – Cristofano Malvezzi, Italian composer (b. 1547)
 February 8 – Robert Rollock, Scottish Presbyterian, first principal of the university of Edinburgh (b. 1555)
 March 19 – Stanisław Radziwiłł, Grand Marshal of Lithuania (b. 1559)
 April 10 – Gabrielle d'Estrées, mistress of King Henry IV of France (b. 1573)
 April 14 – Henry Wallop, English statesman (b. c. 1540)
 April 22 – Lorenz Scholz von Rosenau, German botanist (b. 1552)
 April 27 – Maeda Toshiie, Japanese samurai and warlord (b. 1538)
 May 12 – Sultan Murad Mirza, Mughal prince (b. 1570)
 May 28 – Maria of Nassau, Dutch Countess (b. 1539)
 June 2 – Philipp V, Count of Hanau-Lichtenberg (b. 1541)
 June 14 – Kōriki Masanaga, Japanese military commander (b. 1558)
 June 29 – Archduchess Catherine Renata of Austria, Austrian archduchess (b. 1576)
 July – Kwon Yul, Korean military commander (b. 1537)
 July 11 – Chōsokabe Motochika, Japanese Sengoku Period daimyō
 August 22 – Luca Marenzio, Italian composer (b. 1553)
 September 1 – Cornelis de Houtman, Dutch explorer (b.1565)
 September 11 – Beatrice Cenci, Italian noblewoman (executed for patricide) (b. 1577)
 August 8 – Song Ik-pil, Korean scholar (b. 1534)
 October 18 – Daniel Adam z Veleslavína, Czech lexicographer (b. 1546)
 November 3 – Andrew Báthory, deposed Prince of Transylvania (decapitated) (b. c. 1563)
 November 7 – Gasparo Tagliacozzi, Italian surgeon (b. 1545)
 November 8 – Francisco Guerrero, Spanish composer (b. 1528)
 November 22 – Nanbu Nobunao, Japanese daimyō (b. 1546)
 December 13 – Enrico Caetani, Italian Catholic cardinal (b. 1550)
 December 14 – Joan Boyle, English noble, first spouse of Richard Boyle, 1st Earl of Cork (b. 1578)
 December 27 – Francisco Pérez de Valenzuela, Spanish noble (b. 1528)
 After December 18 – Minye Kyawswa II of Ava, Burmese defecting crown prince of the Toungoo Empire (killed by invading forces) (b. 1567)
 date unknown – Chand Bibi, Indian regent and warrior (b. 1550)

References